John Ighodaro (born July 5, 1990), professionally known as Johnny Drille, is a Nigerian singer and songwriter. His career came into the spotlight when he released a cover of "Awww" by Di'Ja. He is currently signed to Mavin Records.

Early life 
Johnny Drille was born and raised in Edo State, Nigeria. His father is a school principal and clergyman. He has four siblings. Drille started singing in his father's church at an early age.

Education 
He attended the University of Benin, Benin City, where he studied English and Literature.

Career 
Drille began his musical career in church. He was one of the contestants on the sixth season of Project Fame West Africa in 2013. In 2015, he released a cover of Di'Ja's "Awww", which caught the attention of Mavin's CEO Don Jazzy. His debut single "Wait for Me" was released in 2015. It was nominated for Best Alternative Song at The Headies 2016. He teamed up with Niniola, a fellow season 6 contestant, to record "Start All Over". In February 2017, he signed a record deal with Mavin Records.
On September 3, 2021, he released his debut album, which consists of a fourteen track project, before we fall asleep featuring Nigerian and artists, Ayra Starr, Ladipoe, Lagos community choir, Don Jazzy,Chylde,Kwitte, Cilsoul and the classic afro R&B group, Syl plus under the label Mavin Records.

Discography

Album

EP

Singles
2015 – "Wait for Me"
2015 - "Love Don't Lie"
2016 – "My Beautiful Love"
2016 - "Start All Over  (Featuring Niniola)
2017 – "Romeo & Juliet"
2018 – "Halleluya" (featuring Simi)
2018 – "Awa Love"
2019 - "Forever"
2019 - "Shine"
2019 - "Finding Efe"
2019 - "Papa"
2019 - "Dear Future Wife"
2019 - "Count on You"
2020 - "Something Better"
2020 - "Mystery Girl"
2021 - "Bad Dancer"
2021 - "Loving Is Harder"
2022 - "How Are You (My Friend)"

Awards and nominations

References 

1990 births
People from Edo State
Living people
Nigerian male singer-songwriters
Nigerian singer-songwriters
University of Benin (Nigeria) alumni
Nigerian alté singers